Niyazi Emre Altuğ (born 14 April 1969) is Turkish actor and singer.

Biography

Emre Altug was born in Levent, Beşiktaş, Istanbul as the second son to a housewife mother and dentist father. His family is of Niğde origin. He graduated from theatre department of Istanbul University State Conservatory. He is best known for films, theatre sketches "Güldür Güldür" (as different roles) and series "Tatlı Hayat" Turkish remake of The Jeffersons, youth series "Lise Defteri", "Elde Var Hayat", fantasy child series "Sihirli Annem".

He acted on stage in various plays and sang backing vocals to such established artists like Sezen Aksu, Sertab Erener, Levent Yüksel and Nilüfer, before his first album, titled İbreti Alem was released on 28 August 1998. In July 2000 he sang a song called Bir de bana sor for Melih Kibar 's album entitled Yadigar. The song became a huge hit with radio stations. His second album, Sıcak was released on 3 March 2003. In the meantime he appeared in commercials, television films and feature films, like Kolay Para. His third album, Dudak Dudağa came out in 2004, followed by Sensiz Olmuyor a year later. The song, which the album was named after, became the theme song of a television series that was given the same title (Sensiz Olmuyor) and in which Emre played the leading character. The series was aired on Show TV. On 12 June 2007 he released another album, Kişiye Özel. Emre Altuğ was planning to release an English album, for which he traveled to the US and wanted to start working with Mark Feist and Damon Sharpe (who have worked with such artists like Anastacia or Jennifer Lopez and are the producers and co-writers of the charity song Come Together Now), who found Emre's voice outstanding and started to work on four songs with him.

He married the Turkish model Çağla Şıkel in August 2008, with whom he has two sons. The couple divorced in 2015.

Discography

Albums

EPs

Singles

Filmography

Television series

 2001: Tatlı Hayat (Sweet Life): Başar Yıldırım
 2003: Lise Defteri (High School Book): Genc
 2005: Sensiz olmuyor (Won't work without you): Arda
 2006: Hasret (Yearning): Poyraz (mini-series)
 2006: Gülpare: Aslan (mini-series)
 2008: Mert ile Gert: Mert
 2010: Elde Var Hayat: Kenan Dağaşan
 2014: Otel Divane: Fikri Divane
 2019: Güldür Güldür Show: Kazım
 2021: Sihirli Annem: Sadık
 2021: Kırmızı Oda: Dr. Barlas Zalimoğlu
 2022: Yalı Çapkını: Orhan

Feature films

 1999: Asansör (Elevator): Metin
 2000: Ağaçlar Ayakta Ölür (Trees die at their roots): İzzet
 2000: Halk Çocuğu: Ayhan Alpaylıoğulları
 2002: Kolay Para: Eray
 2004: Neredesin Firuze (Where are you, Firuze?): singer
 2005: Balans ve Manevra (Balance and Manoeuvre): guest appearance
 2006: Asterix Vikinglere Karşı
 2006: Eve Giden Yol: 1914: Halit
 2007: Bratz
 2010: Sizi Seviyorum: Erkut
 2018: Sevgili Komşum: Ragip
 2019: Geniş Aile Komşu Kızı

References

Sources
 Biyografi.org

External links
 Sinematürk Data Sheet 
 Emre Altug interview in Hürriyet 

1969 births
Living people
People from Beşiktaş
Turkish male film actors
Turkish pop singers
Singers from Istanbul
Turkish male television actors
21st-century Turkish singers
Turkish lyricists